1st-seeded German pair Julia Görges and Anna-Lena Grönefeld won in the final 6–4, 6–4, against Vitalia Diatchenko and Tatiana Poutchek.

Seeds

Draw

Draw

References
 Doubles Draw

Danish Open (tennis)
E-Boks Danish Open - Doubles